This is a list of presidential trips made by Donald Trump during 2019, the third year of his presidency as the 45th president of the United States.

This list excludes trips made within Washington, D.C., the U.S. federal capital in which the White House, the official residence and principal workplace of the president, is located. Also excluded are trips to Camp David, the country residence of the president. International trips are included. Here are the number of visits per state he traveled to:

 One: Colorado, Illinois, Indiana, Iowa, Mississippi, Nevada, New Hampshire, New Mexico, South Carolina, and West Virginia 
 Two: Alabama, California, Delaware, Kentucky, Michigan, Minnesota, North Carolina, and Wisconsin
 Three: Alaska and Georgia
 Five: Louisiana, Maryland, New York, Ohio, and Pennsylvania
 Six: New Jersey 
 Seven: Texas
 Thirteen: Florida
 Thirty-five: Virginia

January

February

March

April

May

June

July

August

September

October

November

December

See also
List of international presidential trips made by Donald Trump
List of post–2016 election Donald Trump rallies
List of presidential trips made by Donald Trump

References 

2019 in American politics
2019 in international relations
2019-related lists
Lists of events in the United States
Trips, domestic